Maximiliano Daniel Rescia (born 29 October 1987) is an Argentine professional futsal player who plays as a forward for Spanish club Levante Unión Deportiva and for the Argentina national team.

Honours

International
Argentina
FIFA Futsal World Cup: 2016
Copa América: 2015
Confederations Cup: 2014

Individual

References

External links
 Maximiliano Rescia profile

1987 births
Living people
Sportspeople from Buenos Aires
Argentine people of Italian descent
Futsal forwards
Argentine men's futsal players
Argentine expatriate sportspeople in Italy
Argentine expatriate sportspeople in Spain